John Roy (September 13, 1930 – June 13, 2001) was a noted professor in the Art Department at the University of Massachusetts, Amherst from 1964 until his retirement in 1994.  He continued to paint until his death in 2001. His work included pointillism and photorealism and he created a remarkable and highly original body of work that represents an important contribution to the history of late twentieth-century American painting.

Roy was a contemporary and colleague of Chuck Close, and the two influenced each other's work considerably.  Roy was the subject of one of Close's more noted paintings.

Further reading

References

20th-century American painters
American male painters
20th-century American photographers
American contemporary painters
Postmodern artists
1930 births
2001 deaths
Pointillism
Photorealist artists
20th-century American printmakers
20th-century American male artists